Events in the year 2018 in Rwanda.

Incumbents
President: Paul Kagame
Prime Minister: Édouard Ngirente

Events

March onwards – Flooding in Rwanda's hill country caused major landslides that killed more than 200 people.

Deaths

25 January – Patrick Mazimhaka, politician (b. 1948).

11 March – Jean Damascène Bimenyimana, Roman Catholic Bishop (b. 1953)

References

 
2010s in Rwanda
Years of the 21st century in Rwanda
Rwanda
Rwanda